Maewo (formerly Aurora Island) is an island in Vanuatu in Penama province, 105 km to the east of Espiritu Santo.

It is 47 km long, and 6 km wide, with an area of 269 km2. Its highest point is 795 m above sea level. In 2009 the island had a population of almost 3,600. Maewo is covered with dense vegetation: tropical forests in which banyan trees grow.

Name
The name Maewo is thought to have come from Mota or Raga as an attempt to transcribe the pronunciation . In the local languages it is spelled as N̄waewo . Other names for the island include Mwerlap N̄wēw  and Mwotlap Am̄ew  (with the locative prefix a-). All of these terms are thought to have come from Proto-North-Central Vanuatu (and Proto-Torres–Banks) *mʷaewo.

History
First recorded sighting of Maewo Island by Europeans was by the Spanish expedition of Pedro Fernández de Quirós at the end of April 1606. They charted it as Aurora (The light of dawn in Spanish).

Geography
Maewo  is the island with the highest rainfall in Vanuatu. 
The island is covered in green, lush vegetation. The heavy rainfall provides abundant fresh water and waterfalls. There are also hot springs in the centre of Maewo. The largest of these waterfalls is a series of cascades located near Maewo-Naone Airport on the north end of the island near the village of Naone. This series of cascades is commonly referred to as Big Wota. 

The climate on Maevo is humid tropical. The average annual rainfall is about 3,500 mm of rain. There are two seasons in the year: the rainy season, which lasts from November to April, and the dry season, which lasts from May to October. The island is subject to frequent cyclones and earthquakes.

References

Islands of Vanuatu
Penama Province